The term Kra–Dai peoples or Kra–Dai-speaking peoples refers collectively to the ethnic groups of southern China and Southeast Asia, stretching from Hainan to Northeast India and from southern Sichuan to Laos, Thailand and parts of Vietnam, who not only speak languages belonging to the Kra–Dai language family, but also share similar traditions, culture and ancestry.

Origin
Kra–Dai peoples are thought to originate from a homeland on the island of Taiwan, where they spoke a dialect of proto-Austronesian or one of its descendant languages. The Kra–Dai-speaking peoples migrated to southern China, where they brought with them the Proto-Kra–Dai language. Like the Malayo-Polynesians, they may originally have been of Austronesian descent. Unlike the Malayo-Polynesian group who later sailed south to the Philippines and other parts of maritime Southeast Asia, the ancestors of the modern Kra–Dai people sailed west to mainland China and possibly traveled along the Pearl River, where their language greatly changed from other Austronesian languages under the influence of Sino-Tibetan and Hmong–Mien language infusion. Aside from linguistic evidence, the connection between Austronesian and Kra–Dai can also be found in some common cultural practices. Roger Blench (2008) demonstrates that dental evulsion, face tattooing, teeth blackening and snake cults are shared between the Taiwanese Austronesians and the Kra–Dai peoples of Southern China.

James R. Chamberlain (2016) proposes that the Kra–Dai language family was formed as early as the 12th century BCE in the middle of the Yangtze basin, coinciding roughly with the establishment of the Chu state and the beginning of the Zhou dynasty. Following the southward migrations of Kra and Hlai (Rei/Li) peoples around the 8th century BCE, the Yue (Be-Tai people) started to break away and move to the east coast in the present-day Zhejiang province, in the 6th century BCE, forming the state of Yue and conquering the state of Wu shortly thereafter. According to Chamberlain, Yue people (Be-Tai) began to migrate southwards along the east coast of China to what are now Guangxi, Guizhou and northern Vietnam, after Yue was conquered by Chu around 333 BCE. There the Yue (Be-Tai) formed the Luo Yue, which moved into Lingnan and Annam and then westward into northeastern Laos and Sip Song Chau Tai, and later became the Central-Southwestern Tai, followed by the Xi Ou, which became the Northern Tai).

Linguistic subdivisions 
There are five established branches of the Kra–Dai languages, which may not directly correspond to ethnicity:
 the Tai peoples of China and much of Southeast Asia (including most notably the Thai, Lao, Isan, Shan and Zhuang, and Saek people of Laos and Thailand)
 the Hlai people and Be people of China, especially on Hainan
 the Kra peoples of China and Vietnam (also known as the Geyan peoples)
 the Kam–Sui peoples (which may or not include the Biao people) in central China

The Lakkia people of Guangxi Autonomous Region of China (Tai Lakka in neighboring portions of Vietnam) are ethnically of Yao, but speak a Kra–Dai language called Lakkia. These Yao were likely in an area dominated by Tai speakers and assimilated an early Kra–Dai language (possibly the language of the ancestors of the Biao people).
 The Lingao people in Hainan Province of China speak a Kra–Dai language called Be or Lincheng, although the ethnicity of the Lingao traces back to the Han nationality.

Geographic distribution

The Kra-Dai have historically resided in China, continental Southeast Asia and parts of northeastern India since the early Kra-Dai expansion period. Their primary geographic distribution in those countries is roughly in the shape of an arc extending from northeastern India through southern China and down to Southeast Asia. Recent Kra-Dai migrations have brought considerable numbers of Kra-Dai peoples to Japan, Taiwan, Sri Lanka, the United Arab Emirates, Europe, Australia, New Zealand, North America and Argentina as well. The greatest ethnic diversity within the Kra-Dai occurs in China, which is their prehistoric homeland.

History in China

In China, Kra–Dai peoples and languages are mainly distributed in a radial area from the western edge of Yunnan Province to Guangdong, Guangxi, Guizhou Hunan and Hainan Provinces. Most speakers live in compact communities. Some of them are scattered among the Han Chinese or other ethnic minorities. The ancient Baiyue people, who covered a large area in southern China, were their common ancestors.

The use of name Zhuang for the Zhuang people today first appeared in a book named A History of the Local Administration in Guangxi, written by Fan Chengda during the Southern Song Dynasty. From then on, Zhuang would usually be seen in Han Chinese historical books together with Lao. In Guangxi, until the Ming Dynasty, the name Zhuang was generally used to refer to those called Li (originating from Wuhu Man) who lived in compact communities in Guigang (the present name), the Mountain Lao in Guilin and the Tho in Qinzhou. According to A History of the Ming Dynasty – Biography of Guangxi Ethnic Minority Hereditary Headman "In Guangxi, most of the people were the Yaos and the Zhuangs, ...the other small groups were too numerous to mention individually." Gu Yanwu (a Chinese scholar in the Ming Dynasty) gave the correct explanation of this point, saying "The Yao were Jing Man (aborigines from Hunan), and the Zhuang originated from the ancient Yue."

The word Zhuang was the short form of Buzhuang, which was the name the ancestors of the Zhuang people living in the northeast of Guangxi, the south of Guizhou and the west of Guangdong used to refer to themselves. Later this name was gradually accepted by those who had different names, and finally became the general name for the whole group (Ni Dabai 1990). Zhuang had several variant written forms in the ancient Han historical books.

The Buyi, who lived in Yunnan-Guizhou Plateau since ancient times, were called Luoyue, Pu, Puyue, Yi, Yipu, Lao, Pulao, Yilai, etc., in the Qin and Han Dynasties. Since the Yuan Dynasty, the name Zhong, which appeared in the historical book later than Zhuang was used to refer to the Buyi. It was originally a variant form of Zhuang, referring to both the Zhuang and the Buyi in Yunnan, Guangxi and Guizhou. Later, it referred to the Buyi only, and always appeared in the historical books as Zhongjia, Zhongmiao, and Qingzhong, until the early 1950s. Like Zhuang, Zhong may also be the short form of Buzhuang, which Zhuang people use to refer to themselves, as the pronunciation of Zhong and Zhuang is similar, and Zhong was once a variant form of Zhuang in the Han Chinese historical books. But today, Buyi people never use Buzhuang or Buzhong to refer to themselves, therefore, the use of Zhong as the name of Buyi may have something to do with the common origin of these two groups of peoples, or the mass migration by Zhuang into Buyi areas (Zhou Guoyan 1996)

Hlai (黎) people living on Hainan island were called Luoyue (雒越) during the western Han Dynasty. During the period from the Sui to the Tang Dynasty, Li began to appear in the Han historical books. Li (黎) was frequently used in the Song Dynasty, and sometimes Lao was also used. Fan Chengda wrote in History of Local Administration in Guangxi: "On the island (Hainan island) there is a Limu Mountain; different groups of aborigines lived around it, calling themselves Li."

The Kam lived in compact communities in neighboring areas across the Guizhou and Hunan Provinces, and Guangxi Zhuang Autonomous Region until the Ming Dynasty. At that time, the name Dong and Dong-Man began to be recorded, In the Qing Dynasty, they were called Dong Miao, Dong Min and Dong Jia. Much earlier, during the period of the Qin and the Han Dynasty, they were called Wulin Man or Wuxi Man. Later the name Lao, Laohu, and Wuhu were used to refer to a group of people who might be the ancestors of the Kam.

As suggested by some scholars, the ancestors of the Sui were a group of Luoyue (雒越) who were forced to move to the adjacent areas of Guangxi and Guizhou from the Yonjiang River Valley, tracing a path along the Longjiang River because of the chaos of war during the Qin Dynasty. The name Sui first appeared in the Ming Dynasty. Before that, the Sui had been included in the Baiyue, Man and Lao groups.

The ancestors of the Dai in Yunnan were the Dianyue (滇越) group mentioned in the Records of a Historian by Sima Qian. In Records of the Later Han Dynasty, they were called Shan, and in Records of the Local Countries in Southern China, they were called Dianpu. In the Tang Dynasty, they were mentioned as Black Teeth, and as Face-Tattooed in a book named A Survey of the Aborigines by Fan Chuo. These monikers were given based on their customs of tattooing and teeth decoration. In the Song Dynasty, they were called Baiyi Man, and in the Yuan Dynasty were called Jinchi Baiyi. Until the Ming Dynasty, they were generally called Baiyi and after the Qing Dynasty, they were called Baiyi. The modern Dai people can be traced back to Dianyue, a subgroup among the ancient Baiyue groups.

Modern population in China
In southern China, people speaking Kra-Dai languages are mainly found in Guangxi, Guizhou, Yunnan, Hunan, Guangdong, and Hainan. According to statistics from the fourth census taken in China in 1990, the total population of these groups amounted to 23,262,000. Their distribution is as follows:

Dai (or Tai) have a population of about 19 million, mainly inhabiting Guangxi, Yunnan, Guangdong and parts of Guizhou and Hunan provinces.

Kam-Sui (Kam-Shui) have a population of about 4 million and live mainly in Hunan, Guizhou, and in Guangxi.

Kra have a population of about 22,000 and live mostly in Yunnan, Guangxi and Hunan.

Common culture

Language

The languages spoken by the Kra-Dai people are classified as the Kra–Dai language family. The high diversity of Kra–Dai languages in southern China points to the origin of the Kra–Dai language family in southern China. The Tai branch moved south into Southeast Asia only around 1000 AD. These languages are tonal languages, meaning variations in tone of a word can change that word's meaning.

Festivals
Several Kra-Dai groups celebrate a number of common festivals, including a holiday known as Songkran, which originally marked the vernal equinox, but is now celebrated on the 13th of April every year.

Genetics of Kra–Dai-speaking peoples

Y-chromosome polymorphisms are powerful tools in delineating the genetic structure of human populations. A large number of populations in China have been studied in the last several years and 17 Y-chromosome single nucleotide polymorphism (SNP) haplotypes have been found in them, some of which are specific to East Asians. Major ethnic groups tend to have their own characteristic profiles reflected by their respective Y haplotype distribution. Kra–Dai, an ethnic group dispersed from Assam to Taiwan, is a relative homogeneous group, although some resemblance between Kra–Dai and Austronesian groups, especially Taiwanese aborigines, is also noticeable. The haplogroup observed most frequently and regularly among the Kra–Dai-speaking peoples is haplogroup O1b1-K18, which is also the predominant Y-DNA haplogroup among Austroasiatic-speaking peoples and among Austronesian-speaking peoples of Mainland Southeast Asia. Other Y-DNA haplogroups observed frequently in samples of some Kra-Dai-speaking populations include haplogroup O2-M122, which is now widespread throughout southeastern Asia (especially China) and Polynesia, and haplogroup O1a-M119, which is common among Indonesians, Malaysians, Filipinos, and indigenous peoples of Taiwan; however, the distribution of these latter haplogroups among Kra-Dai speakers is very inhomogeneous, with one study finding haplogroup O2-M122 in 29.2% (7/24) and haplogroup O1a-M119 in 0% (0/24) of a sample of Thái, haplogroup O2-M122 in 23.4% (11/47) and haplogroup O1a-M119 in 8.5% (4/47) of a sample of Tày, haplogroup O2-M122 in 13.5% (5/37) and haplogroup O1a-M119 in 2.7% (1/37) of a sample of Nùng, haplogroup O2-M122 in 22.2% (8/36) and haplogroup O1a-M119 in 47.2% (17/36) of a sample of La Chí, and haplogroup O2-M122 in 5.9% (2/34) and haplogroup O1a-M119 in 5.9% (2/34) of a sample of Cờ Lao in Vietnam.

The distribution of Y-chromosome SNP haplotypes in 30 Kra–Dai populations were studied. Among the 19 SNPs studied, M119, M110, M95, and M88 are most informative in delineating the genetic structure of Kra–Dai. Linguistic and cultural classification are in general concordance with the genetic classification, although it may be transgressed due to the apparent gene flow between the major branches of Kra–Dai. For example, some populations of the Kadai, a major branch of Kra–Dai, are more similar to the populations of the Kam–Sui, another major branch. This phenomenon may be the result of the unitary self-identification and geographic assimilation of Kra–Dai system. The geographic distribution of the three principal components (PCs) were generated by superimposing the loading coefficients of each population onto a map, respectively.

The distribution of the first PC suggested a possible single origin of all the Kra–Dai populations. The second PC indicated a deep division of the Kra–Dai peoples into two: east group and west group. The center of the east group is in Zhejiang, China, and that of the west one is on the border between China and Burma. The third PC implies the migration routes southern China towards northeast, northwest and southwest during the relocation of Kra–Dai populations. The gene flow between Kra–Dai and populations of other ethnic groups are noticeable. Han Chinese in Zhejiang and Shanghai have the highest concentration of Kra–Dai types of Y haplotypes among all the Han populations in China, suggesting a possible expansion of Kra–Dai peoples from southern China to Zhejiang via Jiangxi. Kra–Dai in Zhejiang and Fujian might have come by different routes, as suggested by the difference of their profiles. A diphyletic genetic structure was found in Taiwan Aborigines. The West Kra–Dai, Tai, Thai, Ahom and so on emigrated from southern China rather late. It might have happened one to two thousand years ago.

Li (2008) 
The following table of Y-chromosome DNA haplogroup frequencies of modern Kra-Dai speaking peoples is from Li, et al. (2008).

Full genome analysis 
A recent genetic and linguistic analysis in 2015 showed great genetic homogeneity between Kra-Dai speaking people, suggesting a common ancestry and a large replacement of former non-Kra-Dai groups in Southeast Asia. Kra-Dai populations are closest to southern Chinese and Taiwanese populations.

Notes

References 

 
Tai history
History of Thailand
Ethnic groups in Southeast Asia
Ethnic groups in Thailand
Ethnic groups in China
Ethnic groups in Laos
Ethnic groups in Vietnam
Ethnic groups in Myanmar